The Cornwall Chronicle was a newspaper published in Launceston, Tasmania, Australia from 14 February 1835 to 13 November 1880. The publisher was William Lushington Goodwin.

References

External links
 
 

Defunct newspapers published in Tasmania
Publications established in 1835
Publications disestablished in 1880